Zina Hidouri is a Tunisian former footballer. She played as a forward and has captained the Tunisia women's national team.

Club career
Hidouri has played for Tunis Air Club and AS Banque de l’Habitat in Tunisia.

International career
Hidouri capped for Tunisia at senior level during two Africa Women Cup of Nations qualifications (2012 and 2014).

International goals
Scores and results list Tunisia's goal tally first

See also
List of Tunisia women's international footballers

References

External links

Year of birth missing (living people)
Living people
Tunisian women's footballers
Women's association football forwards
Tunisia women's international footballers